Bench Accounting (branded as "Bench") is a fintech company that uses proprietary software, to automate bookkeeping and provide financials for small business owners. Bench was founded in 2012 by Ian Crosby, along with Jordan Menashy, Adam Saint, and Pavel Rodionov. The company provides subscription access to cloud-based software in combination with in-house bookkeepers. Bench has raised $53M in funding to date  and currently employs around 550 people out of its Vancouver headquarters.

History
In November 2010, Ian Crosby and Jordan Menashy co-founded 10Sheet Services, Inc., after identifying the need for an online bookkeeping solution for small business owners. Adam Saint and Pavel Rodionov joined Crosby and Menashy as co-founders in 2012. They were accepted into the startup accelerator program Techstars NYC in 2012 and by July 2013, they had raised $2 million in seed capital and settled on the official name, Bench.

Funding
Bench launched their product to the general public in 2013 after raising a $2 million seed round, followed by $7 million in Series A funding  led by Altos Ventures, with Contour Venture Partners participating. In January 2014, Bench Accounting raised $1 Million from VCs and angel investors. In 2016, they raised $16 million in Series B funding, led by Bain Capital Investments, with Altos Ventures, and Contour Venture Partners participating. In 2018, Bench secured $18 million in a B-1 funding round led by iNovia Capital with participation from existing investors Bain Capital Ventures, Altos Ventures, and Silicon Valley Bank.

Product

Features and Integrations 
Bench is available on desktop and iOS mobile app. Bench’s core product is online bookkeeping software paired with in-house bookkeepers. Services include historical and monthly bookkeeping, cash flow and expense tracking, and financial reporting. Bench Bookkeeping also integrates with several other third-party apps including Stripe, Square, and PayPal.

In June 2019, Bench launched a new cash flow management tool called Pulse.

As of August 2019, Bench announced BenchTax in partnership with Taxfyle in order to provide tax preparation and filing for clients.

As of August 2020, Bench is not yet BBB accredited.

Awards and recognition 

 Forbes 30 Under 30 
 2018 Deloitte Fast 50 
 2016 Fintech Five
 Rated 3.2/5 stars on Apple App Store

See also 

 Accounting software
 BooksTime
 Square
 Stripe 
 Shopify
 Gusto
 FreshBooks
 MINDBODY

References

External links
Official site
Bench App in Apple App Store
Accounting firms of Canada
Accounting software
Financial software companies
Companies based in Vancouver